Toelgyfaloca circumdata is a moth in the family Drepanidae. It was described by Constant Vincent Houlbert in 1921. It is found in China in Beijing, Shanxi, Henan, Shaanxi, Gansu, Hubei, Sichuan and Yunnan.

References

Moths described in 1921
Thyatirinae